102 Street stop is a tram stop under construction in the Edmonton Light Rail Transit network in Edmonton, Alberta, Canada. It will serve the Valley Line and will be the terminus station until the line is extended west. It is located on the north side of 102 Avenue between 101 and 102 Streets, in Downtown Edmonton. The stop was scheduled to open in 2020; however, as of December 2022 the  Valley Line had not opened and no definite opening date had been announced.

Around the station
Centre High
City Centre Mall
Don Wheaton Family YMCA
Manulife Place

References

External links
TransEd Valley Line LRT

Edmonton Light Rail Transit stations
Railway stations under construction in Canada
Valley Line (Edmonton)